The elm cultivar Ulmus 'Rufa' [:rufous-coloured] was listed as U. campestris f. rufa by Georg Dieck, of Zöschen, Germany, without description in Haupt-catalog der Obst- und gehölzbaumschulen des ritterguts Zöschen bei Merseburg, Nachtrag I (1887), though it had been in cultivation for some decades before this date. It was considered "possibly Ulmus carpinifolia" (: Ulmus minor) by Green.

Description
Not available. An 1834 Paris herbarium specimen shows near-orbicular leaves like those of English elm (see 'External links').

Cultivation
Ulmus rufa, 'European red elm', was marketed by Prince's nursery of Flushing, New York from the 1840s. No specimens are known to survive.

References

External links
  Sheet labelled Ulmus rufa, Hort. Bot. Parisiensis (1834)

Ulmus articles missing images
Ulmus
Missing elm cultivars